Six referendums were held in Switzerland during 1938. The first four were held on 20 February; the first on amending articles 107 and 116 of the constitution to make Romansch an official language, which was approved by over 90% of voters and all cantons. The second was on a popular initiative "on urgent federal resolutions and the protection of people's rights" and was rejected by 85% of voters. The third was on a popular initiative on the private arms industry, and was also rejected by a wide margin, whilst the fourth was on a counter-proposal to the arms industry question, and was approved by voters. The fifth referendum was held on 3 July on the penal code, and was approved. The sixth and final referendum of the year was held on 27 November on a federal resolution on the transient order of the federal budget, and was approved by 72% of voters.

Background
The referendums on making Romansch an official language and the federal budget were both "obligatory" referendums, requiring a double majority; a majority of the popular vote and majority of the cantons. The decision of each canton was based on the vote in that canton. Full cantons counted as one vote, whilst half cantons counted as half. The popular initiatives on federal resolutions and the arms industry also required a double majority, as did the counter proposal to the arms industry question. The referendum on the penal code was an "optional referendum", which required only a majority of voters in favour.

Results

February: Romansch as an official language

February: popular initiative on federal resolutions

February: popular initiative on the private arms industry

February: Counter-proposal on the private arms industry

July: Penal code

November: Federal budget

References

1938 referendums
1938 in Switzerland
Referendums in Switzerland